Alexander Dawson School may refer to:

The Alexander Dawson School at Rainbow Mountain
Alexander Dawson School (Lafayette, Colorado)